The Australian Cup is a Victoria Racing Club Group 1 Thoroughbred horse race for horses three years old and older, held under Weight for Age conditions, over a distance of 2000 metres, at Flemington Racecourse, Melbourne, Australia in March during the VRC Autumn Racing Carnival. Total prize money for the race is A$1,500,000.

History

The race was once Australia's premier long distance race, raced at a distance of 18 furlongs (3621m) - thus, longer than the Melbourne Cup. In 1943 the race was shortened to 17 furlongs 110 yards to allow the race to be started from the top of Flemington's famous Straight Six, to have bigger fields.

The VRC in the early 1960s shortened the distance to  miles to attract classier middle distance gallopers.

Stakes were increased from $1 million to $1.5 million in 2016.

1954 racebook

Distance
 1863–1942  -   miles (~3627m)
 1943–1962  –  2 miles  furlongs (~3528m)
 1963 -  miles (~2821m)
 1964–1972  -   miles (~2015m)
 1973 onwards - 2000 metres

Conditions
 1863–1978 - Handicap
 1978–1981 - Weight for Age
 1982–1986 - Handicap
 1987 onwards - Weight for Age

Grade
 1863–1979 - Principal Race
 1979 onwards - Group 1

Venue
In 2007 the race was run at Caulfield Racecourse due to refurbishment work at Flemington Racecourse.

Records
Makybe Diva won this race in 2005 in the Australian record time of 1:58:73, which beat Northerly's previous record.
The most successful trainer has been Bart Cummings with thirteen wins – 1968, 1973, 1975, 1976, 1977, 1978, 1980, 1981, 1985, 1992, 1996, 1998, 2008.

The most successful jockey is Tom Hales who won the Australian Cup eight times – Lurline (1875), Richmond (1876), Savanaka (1879), Navigator (1883), Morpeth (1884), Trident (1887), Carlyon (1888), Dreadnought (1890).

Winners

 2022 - Duais
 2021 - Homesman
 2020 - Fifty Stars
 2019 - Harlem
 2018 - Harlem
 2017 - Humidor
 2016 - Preferment
 2015 - Spillway
 2014 - Fiorente
 2013 - Super Cool
 2012 - Manighar
 2011 - Shocking
 2010 - Zipping
 2009 - Niconero
 2008 - Sirmione
 2007 - Pompeii Ruler
 2006 - Roman Arch
 2005 - Makybe Diva
 2004 - Lonhro
 2003 - Northerly
 2002 - Old Comrade
 2001 - Northerly
 2000 - Intergaze
 1999 - Istidaad
 1998 - Dane Ripper
 1997 - Octagonal
 1996 - Saintly
 1995 - Starstruck
 1994 - Durbridge
 1993 - Veandercross
 1992 - Let's Elope
 1991 - Better Loosen Up
 1990 - Vo Rogue
 1989 - Vo Rogue
 1988 - Dandy Andy
 1987 - Bonecrusher
 1986 - Playful Princess
 1985 - Noble Peer
 1984 - Admiral Lincoln
 1983 - Spectrum
 1982 - Kip
 1981 - Hyperno
 1980 - Ming Dynasty
 1979 - Dulcify
 1978 - Ming Dynasty
 1977 - Ngawyni
 1976 - Lord Dudley
 1975 - Leilani
 1974 - Bush Win
 1973 - Gladman
 1972 - Jan's Beau
 1971 - Gay Icarus
 1970 - Crewman
 1969 - †Yootha / Cyron 
 1968 - Arctic Coast
 1967 - Bore Head
 1966 - Craftsman
 1965 - Craftsman
 1964 - Grand Print
 1963 - Welkin Prince
 1962 - Welkin Prince
 1961 - Dream King
 1960 - Illoura
 1959 - Gaybao
 1958 - Dream Son
 1957 - Miss High Caste
 1956 - Pushover
 1955 - Hellion
 1954 - Sunish
 1953 - Arbroath
 1952 - Murray Glen
 1951 - Bold Belle
 1950 - Bold John
 1949 - New Cashmere
 1948 - Bannerette
 1947 - Sydney James
 1946 - Knockarlow
 1945 - Spectre
 1944 - Similar
 1943 - Taramoa
 1942 - Wise Counsel
 1941 - Saul
 1940 - Indignity
 1939 - Pageant
 1938 - Marauder
 1937 - Mutable
 1936 - Amalia
 1935 - Sylvandale
 1934 - Heroic Prince
 1933 - Topical
 1932 - Madstar
 1931 - Carry On
 1930 - Nadean
 1929 - Some Quality
 1928 - Sea Money
 1927 - Spearfelt
 1926 - Pilliewinkie
 1925 - Answer
 1924 - Accarak
 1923 - Prince Cox
 1922 - Harvest King
 1921 - The Rover
 1920 - Macadam
 1919 - New Tipperary
 1918 - Defence
 1917 - Harriet Graham
 1916 - Cherubini
 1915 - Lempriere
 1914 - Wallalo
 1913 - Almissa
 1912 - †Saxonite / Prizefighter 
 1911 - The Parisian
 1910 - Orline
 1909 - Pendil
 1908 - Peru
 1907 - Realm
 1906 - Tartan
 1905 - Lord Ullin's Daughter
 1904 - Marmont
 1903 - Great Scot
 1902 - Blue Metal
 1901 - Dreamland
 1900 - La Carabine
 1899 - Bobadil
 1898 - Ayrshire
 1897 - Coil
 1896 - Idolator
 1895 - Havoc
 1894 - Broken Hill
 1893 - Portsea
 1892 - Highborn
 1891 - Vengeance
 1890 - Dreadnought
 1889 - Lochiel
 1888 - Carlyon
 1887 - Trident
 1886 - Malua
 1885 - Ringwood
 1884 - Morpeth
 1883 - Navigator
 1882 - Pollio
 1881 - Firstwater
 1880 - Columbus
 1879 - Savanaka
 1878 - First King
 1877 - Sybil
 1876 - Richmond
 1875 - Lurline
 1874 - Protos
 1873 - Warrior
 1872 - ‡Saladin
 1871 - Nimblefoot
 1870 - Norma
 1869 - Gasworks
 1868 - Shenandoah
 1867 - Tim Whiffler
 1866 - Woodman
 1865 - Woodman
 1864 - Nathalie
 1863 - Barwon

† Dead heat
‡ Saladin and Flying Dutchman dead heated. After a re-run they dead heated again. On a second re-run Saladin was victorious.

See also
 List of Australian Group races
 Group races

References

Open middle distance horse races
Group 1 stakes races in Australia
Flemington Racecourse